Rizzotto is an Italian surname. It may refer to:

Cosimo Rizzotto (1893–1963), Italian World War I flying ace
Laura Rizzotto (born 1994), Brazilian-Latvian singer
Placido Rizzotto (1914–1948), Italian socialist trade union leader
Vincent M. Rizzotto (1931–2021), U.S. Roman Catholic prelate

Italian-language surnames